Karol Ząbik (born October 25, 1986 in Toruń, Poland) is a Polish speedway rider who has won World, European and Polish Under-21 titles and has ridden for the Polish national junior team.

His father, Jan Ząbik was also a speedway rider, and is now the team manager of Polish speedway club KS Toruń.

Speedway Grand Prix results

Career

World Under-21 Championship
2006 - World Champion
2007 - 5th place (10 points)

Under-21 World Cup
2005 - World Champion (3 points)
2006 - World Champion (13 points)
2007 - World Champion (10 points)

European Under-19 Championship
2004 - Silver medal (12+3 points)
2005 - European Champion

Polish Individual Championship
2004 - 8th place in Quarter-Final A
2006 - 18 place (as 2nd track reserve; 11th in Semi-Final B)

Polish Under-21 Championship
2003 - 14th place (2 points; as track reserve)
2004 - 12th in Semi-Final A
2005 - Bronze medal (10+3 points)
2006 - Polish Champion (14 points)
2007 - Silver medal

Polish Pairs Speedway Championship
2005 - 5th place with KS Toruń (5 points)
2006 - 3rd in Semi-Final C with KS Toruń

Polish Under-21 Pairs Championship
2003 - 3rd in Semi-Final C
2004 - Bronze medal (7 points)
2005 - 4th place (8 points)
2006 - 6th place (but he rode in Semi-Final A only)

Ekstraliga Championship
2003 - Silver medal with KS Toruń
2004 - 4 place with KS Toruń
2005 - 4 place with KS Toruń
2006 - 7 place with KS Toruń

Polish Under-21 Team Championship
2003 - 2nd in Qualification Group A
2004 - Polish Champion (13 points)
2005 - Polish Champion (8 points)
2006 - 4th in Qualification Group D
2007 - Qualification Group A (last round September 15)

Golden Helmet
2007 - 13th place (4 points)

Silver Helmet (U-21)
2004 - 6th place (9 points)
2005 - injury (3rd in Semi-Final B, promotion to Final)2006 - Gold medal (15 points)
2007 - Semi-Finals will be on September 4

Bronze Helmet (U-19)
2003 - injury (2nd in Semi-Final A, promotion to Final)2004 - 16th place (0 points in 2 heats; two fells'')

See also
Unibax Toruń

External links
(en) (pl) Official Site

1986 births
Living people
Polish speedway riders
Sportspeople from Toruń
Team Speedway Junior World Champions
Individual Speedway Junior European Champions
European Pairs Speedway Champions
Peterborough Panthers riders
Poole Pirates riders